Leipzig-Plagwitz is a railway station located in Leipzig, Germany. The station opened on 20 October 1873. The station is located on the Leipzig–Probstzella railway, Leipzig-Plagwitz–Markkleeberg-Gaschwitz railway and Leipzig-Plagwitz–Leipzig Miltitzer Allee railway. The train services are operated by Deutsche Bahn and Erfurter Bahn. Since December 2013 the station is served by the S-Bahn Mitteldeutschland.

References

External links
 

Plagwitz
Railway stations in Germany opened in 1873